LeMahieu is a French surname. Notable people with this name include:

 Hester Le Mahieu (born 1582), American pioneer.  She married Francis Cooke, captain of the Mayflower, on 4 July 1603, in Leiden, Holland, Netherlands. 
 William LeMahieu (born 1840), American Pioneer and Civil War Veteran from Wisconsin
Daniel LeMahieu (1946-2022), American politician from Wisconsin
Devin LeMahieu (born 1972), American politician from Wisconsin
DJ LeMahieu (born 1988), American baseball player with Wisconsin roots
Paul LeMahieu, American educator

French-language surnames